Thomas Hoy may refer to: 
Thomas Hoy (poet) (1659–1718), English physician and poet
Thomas Hoy (botanist) (died 1822), English gardener and botanist
Tom Hoy, musician with Natural Acoustic Band